The 1932 season was the 24th season of the Auckland Rugby League.

Devonport United won the Senior grade with a 7 win, 2 draw, and 1 loss record ahead of Marist Old Boys and Ponsonby United. They were the dominant team and their only loss came in the final round when they had already secured their second title first having won it in 1928. Marist Old Boys stuffed their trophy cabinet when they won the Roope Rooster (defeating City Rovers 28–8), Stormont Shield (defeating Devonport United 15–8), and Max Jaffe Cup for finishing runner up in the Senior Championship (they beat Ponsonby United in a playoff after both teams tied for second by 37 to 8). City Rovers won the Thistle Cup after beating Devonport in the final by 22 to 19 after both teams finished with 8 competitions points in the second round thus forcing a playoff for the Cup. Richmond won the Davis Shield after their lower grade teams combined for the most competition points in Auckland. This was remarkably their 10th win in the Shields 12-year history.

In the reserve grade Richmond Reserves won with an 8 win, 2 loss record, with Ponsonby Reserves finishing runner up. The Marist Old Boys club added yet another trophy to their season haul with their reserve grade team winning the Stallard Cup (awarded to the reserve grade knockout winners) when they beat Devonport Reserves by 12–6 in the final.

The representative program was marked by a match between Auckland and the touring England team. In a very competitive match Auckland went down by 14 to 19. Aside from this fixture Auckland only played matches against South Auckland where they won 29 to 13, and Lower Waikato in Huntly where they won 35–8. There were a series of trial matches such as North Island v South Island and Probables v Possibles matches dominated by Auckland players.

Annual general meeting 
At the annual general meeting of the Auckland Rugby League on 11 April, Mr. E.J. Phelan presided as acting president due to Mr. James Carlaw’s absence. The plan put in place at the beginning of the 1931 season of having each club electing two members to represent them on the management committee and clubs taking a percentage of the gate receipts was considered a success. The election of officers took place and the results were: Patron: Hon. J.B. Donald (re-elected), President: Mr. James Carlaw (re-elected), Vice-presidents: Mr. George McMillan, Mr. O. Blackwood, Mr. S.H. Grange, Mr. W. Wallace, Mr. Gordon Seagar, Mr. Richard (Dick) Benson, Mr. C.H. Drysdale, Mr. E.J. Phelan, Mr. A.E. Laird, Mr. John .A. Lee, Mr. R.H. Woods, Mr. R.T. Sharman (all re-elected), and Mr. W.J. Meilklejohn, Mr. G. Gray Campbell, Mr. J.W. Dixon, and Mr. C. Faulkner.

Manukau Rugby League Club reborn, club name changes and competition restructuring 
Prior to the season commencing the Mount Wellington club requested permission to change its name to Otahuhu Rovers and this was approved by the league. Their chairman Mr. L.W. Arnold said that the reorganised club was in good hands and they would enter teams in the second, fourth, and school teams grades. Their colours would be royal blue.

It was decided that the Ellerslie-Otahuhu club would revert to the name of Ellerslie United, and that senior players would be able to transfer to any other club, but juniors would need to obtain transfer clearance from Ellerslie.

At a meeting the following night the league decided to cut the teams in the first grade from seven to six with Ellerslie (or rather the combined Ellerslie-Otahuhu United team of 1931) being culled from the grade. The teams which would remain were Marist Old Boys, Devonport United, Ponsonby United, City Rovers, Newton Rangers, Richmond Rovers. The New Zealand Herald previewed the 6 teams in the week leading up to the first round of matches. It was initially decided to play two senior matches at Carlaw Park with the reserve teams playing the curtain raisers. However, for Round 2 it was decided to play all three senior matches at Carlaw Park and reserve grade games elsewhere. This was a decision which clubs fought over as they wanted their reserve teams playing prior to the Senior A teams in case of needing players. This came to a fore after Round 5 when City Rovers arrived at Devonport, New Zealand 4 players short. Fortunately for them the reserve grade match was being played at the same venue at 1:30pm and so they were able to use those players to avoid defaulting.

In mid September plans began to manifest for the formation of a Manukau Rugby League Club. The plans were reported to an Auckland Rugby League Management Committee meeting. It was stated that there was a good deal of playing talent in the Manukau district. Mr. J. Rukutai was deputed to investigate the matter. On Thursday, 29 September they placed an ad for intending players and supporters to be held at the Strand Theatre Buildings, Onehunga. At this meeting the club was officially formed with Mr. H. Kemp convening the meeting. There were 52 people present including W. Mincham, referee of the RL Association, and Mr. T. Davis, secretary of the junior control board. Mr. J Rukutai said that the proposed club had been discussed by the league and they would give it every consideration. A resolution to form the club and have its headquarters in Onehunga was adopted. Mr W. Hayward was elected chairman, with the patron being Mr. W. J. Jordan, M.P., and the president Mr. E. Martin, Mayor of Onehunga. Financial assistance has also been promised by several local businessmen. A committee was formed to further the development of the club during the off season. The newly formed club asked that an exhibition match be played in Onehunga so that the club could gain some funds. Permission was granted for the match between second grade knockout final between Mangere and Mount Albert to be played at the Onehunga Recreation Reserve. The match was won by Mangere by 18 points to 15.

Financial statement, player passes and ground fees 
The financial statement said that the revenue from the 1931 season totalled £2,907 with £2,293 coming from gate receipts and £228 from ground rents. Spending had amounted to £2,066 meaning a net surplus of £813. Of this £472 was given to Auckland clubs, £68 to the Referees’ Association and the Junior Management Committee, £30 in grants to visiting teams, £195 in honorariums, and £66 in presentations and trophies. Carlaw Park was valued as an asset at £10,152. At a meeting of the Auckland Rugby League Board of Control on 17 March it was decided to continue with giving teams a percentage of the gate takings as had been started in 1931.

The League made a decision on an issue that had caused problems for several years, which was the abuse of players passes to gain entry to Carlaw Park on match days. Club secretaries would now have to supply the names of senior team players and that they would be checked in a side gate by a special official.

It was decided to admit military patients from Auckland Hospital into Carlaw Park to watch Senior matches free of charge news. The Patients’ Welfare Committee gratefully acknowledged the league for the move.

The Auckland Rugby League, Auckland Rugby Union, and Auckland Football Association had asked the City Council if they could reduce their ground fees owing to the number of unemployed players. The City Council decided to reduce charges despite their Parks Committee suggesting otherwise. Mr. E.J. Phelan moved to reduce fees from 5s to 3s for games played from 12:30pm to 1:45pm, from 10s to 7s/6d for games played from 1:45pm to 3pm, and from 15s to 12s/6d for games played from 3pm onwards. This motion was passed by a show of hands.

Radio broadcast of Carlaw Park games 
For the first ever time commentary of a game at Carlaw Park was broadcast. The 1ZQ station broadcast coverage of the Ponsonby v Devonport game in Round 1.

Rule issues 
At the Auckland Rugby League Referees’ Association meeting on 16 May the City Club inquired about the play the ball rule. It was said that the rule was not being enforced properly regarding the forwards needing to be inside a 5-yard radius behind their halfback when the ball was being played. The New Zealand Council also wished for it to be known that the attacking side had the loose head at scrums but the defending team were to put the ball in. In addition hookers were not to go on their knees in scrums in order to get an advantage when raking the ball back.

Bert Cooke switches codes 
In the middle of the season the famous All Black Bert Cooke (rugby) switched codes when he moved back to Auckland. He signed with the Richmond Rovers. The move proved very successful, so much so that he was selected for the North Island team in a trial match against the South Island only weeks after switching codes. He scored three tries and was selected for the New Zealand team to play England.

Obituaries

D.W. McLean
On 1 March Mr. D. W. McLean suffered a heart attack and died at a meeting of the North Shore Rowing Club where he was president. He was the first New Zealand president of rugby league in Auckland. He, along with Mr. William Wynyard and others was one of the founders of rugby league in New Zealand.

William Wynyard
In August William Thomas Wynyard, aged 49 died. He was from a sporting family with three uncles who were part of the 1888–89 New Zealand Native football team that went on a rugby union tour of Great Britain. William played rugby union for North Shore and was an Auckland trialist before switching codes. He was a member of the New Zealand team which toured England in 1907–08 playing in 15 matches and scoring 4 tries. He was then part of the inaugural Auckland rugby league competition in 1909 playing intermittently for North Shore Albions from 1909 to 1913, and representing Auckland in 5 matches from 1908 to 1910. He retired in 1913 but remained involved in the game for many years after.

Harry Johns
On the morning of 4 October the Richmond senior player Harry Johns died aged 21 after a boxing match at the Auckland Town Hall the previous evening. He was knocked out in the 14th round of a 15-round fight by Archie Hughes of New South Wales. Johns had played junior football for Richmond since the age of 13 where he was a halfback. He had been in the seventh grade team which had won the championship and he repeated this feat in the following two years. In 1931 he was in the Third Intermediate grade which won the grade and he was promoted to the reserve grade team in 1932. His form was so good that he was promoted to the senior side and made the Probables versus Possibles match which played at Carlaw Park on 23 July. He was regarded as a certainty to gain higher honours in the future. Johns was originally from the West Coast of the South Island and was the oldest in a family of four. Several articles were published in The New Zealand Herald and the Auckland Star newspapers on his life and death. It was later reported that he had sustained a concussion in the Probables v Possibles match and bled from the nose along with requiring stitches in his head. He fought in Hastings shortly afterwards and lost. Johns then complained of feeling unwell and produced a medical certificate that he was not fit to fight. However he carried on playing league in the interim until beginning training for the fatal bout. It was said that those who knew him well could tell that he was not his usual self in the fight. He was laid to rest on 5 October at Waikumete Cemetery following an enormous gathering at the service with boxers and footballers walking before the cortege. Over 70 motor cars tailed the hearse and the entire procession was a mile long. The casket was draped in Richmond colours of blue and maroon.

Fox Memorial Shield (senior grade championship)

Fox Memorial standings

References

External links 
 Auckland Rugby League Official Site

Auckland Rugby League seasons
Auckland Rugby League